Qeshlaq-e Chukhli Quyi Hajj Akbar (also Romanized as Qeshlāq-e Chūkhlī Qūyī Ḩājj Akbar) is a village in Qeshlaq-e Gharbi Rural District, Aslan Duz District, Parsabad County, Ardabil Province, Iran. At the 2006 census, its population was 45, in 7 families.

References 

Towns and villages in Parsabad County